Martha Speaks is a children's animated television series based on the 1992 children's book of the same name by Susan Meddaugh.

The series is produced by WGBH-TV in Boston, along with Canadian animation studios DHX Media Vancouver and Oasis Animation. It premiered on September 1, 2008 and ended on November 18, 2014, lasting for six years. Some episodes of this television series were available for limited theatrical release on January 3, 2009. The show focuses mainly on synonyms, phonics, and vocabulary, with each episode featuring an underlying theme illustrated with (usually informal) keywords. The show also occasionally focuses on introducing children ages 4–7 to different concepts of science, history, astronomy, and other learning concepts, such as the Spanish language, through passing mentions.

The second season began airing on September 14, 2009. The third season of Martha Speaks premiered on PBS Kids on October 11, 2010, and the fourth season began airing on February 20, 2012. The fifth season premiered on June 24, 2013. The sixth and final season premiered on March 31, 2014.

Premise
The series revolves around a talking dog named Martha (voiced by Tabitha St. Germain), who is owned by 10-year-old Helen Lorraine (known in the books as Helen Finney). When Helen fed Martha alphabet soup, the pasta letters somehow traveled to her brain rather than her stomach, giving her the ability to speak human words. The show takes place in the fictional town of Wagstaff City.

Episodes

Season 1 of the series ended with a total of 40 episodes; it premiered in September 2008. 30 episodes were produced for season 2 and then split in half to be aired over two broadcast seasons with 15 episodes each.

Words defined by characters were off-screen during Season 1, but were made visible from Season 2 onward. When first aired, the series was followed by Music Time with SteveSongs and later by Dot's Story Factory. Season 2 episodes were followed by a segment called Who's That Dog? in which a clip of a dog with special training is shown. The series was available to stream on Netflix, with three of the seasons from the show until July 2015.

Characters

Animals 
Martha Lorraine (voiced by Tabitha St. Germain) is the titular protagonist. Martha is a talking Labrador mix that was born an energetic stray and was put in the dog pound as a puppy. She gained the ability to talk after Helen gave her a bowl of alphabet soup; the letters in the soup went to her brain instead of her stomach. In order to retain this ability, Martha has to continue to eat the soup. She is also capable of speaking different languages if the soup she eats is from another country, but can only speak one language at a time (e.i., if she were to eat a can of soup from France, she'd only be able to speak French until she was fed another can). The phenomenon could not be repeated with another dog. She was based on a dog owned by Susan Meddaugh, which in turn could be named after the dog in subject of the Paul McCartney song Martha My Dear. Martha can understand most animal languages except for a few exotic animals such as monkeys and giraffes. These languages are difficult, as slight elongation or slightly higher pitch will mean something entirely altered. In the episode "Itchy Martha", Martha teaches T.D.'s father to speak a word in dog, coaching him to say it exactly right. Almost all animals are able to understand some sort of human language, but are not able to speak it. In a newer episode, it is stated that Martha understands a wide range of animal languages, possibly because they have the same grammar system. She has had three superhero alter-egos.
Skits Lorraine (voiced by Brian Drummond) is Helen's other dog, who tried the same alphabet soup, but did not gain the same talking ability. Despite not being able to speak, he is still a very smart, and funny dog. He was found by T.D. who could not keep Skits because his father is allergic to dogs. Skits was first introduced in the episode "Martha and Skits".

Children
 Helen Lorraine (voiced by Madeleine Peters) is Martha's and Skits' tomboyish owner who has medium-length auburn hair and is usually the voice of reason of the group. Helen is closest to Martha and thinks of Martha as her best friend. Out of the six main kids, Helen is sensible. Despite this, she can be a bit overbearing and even show her rough side (as in "Martha Runs Away", where she scolded Martha for things she did not do). She always hangs around  her friends, but T.D. is said to be her best friend. She is 10 years old. Her superhero alter ego from Verb Dog, When Action Calls! is very huge and can brainwash dogs simply by calling their names.
T.D. Kennelly (voiced by Alex Ferris in the first 4 seasons and Valin Shinyei starting with season 5) is Helen's best friend. His father, O.G., is an inventor, while his mother is the vice-principal at his school. He has a grandfather named C.K., who works as a farmhand, and also a younger cousin named C.D. T.D. also mentioned having an unnamed older sister, who has never made an appearance in the series due to her studies. T.D. has curly blond hair. He lives a Bohemian lifestyle that revolves around the surreal. His robot alter-ego from Verb Dog, When Action Calls! uses robotic tentacles that grow from his back.
 Alice Boxwood (voiced by Christina Crivici in the first 3 seasons, Michelle Creber in season 4 and Ashlyn Drummond starting with season 5) is another one of Helen's best friends. She has blonde hair in a ponytail, wears glasses, brown shorts, red-and-white shoes, and a green shirt with a blue stripe. She has an older brother named Ronald who mocks her, and a pet cat named Nelson, with whom Martha is mortal enemies. Her superhero alter-ego possesses ice powers; her only weakness is anyone making her laugh, which causes her to lose control of her powers and freeze herself.
 Carolina (voiced by Vanesa Tomasino) is Helen's maternal cousin. She is very fashion-conscious of others, but in music, she sings off-key. She is described as a know-it-all with some signs of shallow. She often uses Spanish words and phrases, giving the translation shortly afterwards. Her father is named Jorge (Mariela's sibling).
 Truman Oatley (voiced by Cedric Payne) is another one of Helen's best friends who enjoys reading historical works of literature and is prone to seasickness. He is African-American. He is often a pessimist who focuses on the negative without any confidence and is unwilling to try other things because he is frequently convinced that the activity is pointless; additionally he is afraid of insects. Truman is younger than Helen, T.D., and Alice. Oddly, the design on his vest closely resembles the logo of the Santiago Metro.
 James "Jake" Lorraine (voiced by Tabitha St. Germain) is Helen's toddler sibling whom Martha enjoys teaching on how to talk, with unsuccessful attempts. His birth is emphasized in the episode The Jakey Express. In the Spanish dub, he is named Pedrito.
 Tiffany Blatsky:

Adults
 Daniel "Danny" Lorraine (also voiced by Brian Drummond) is Helen's father who works as a bus driver and an actor in the community theater. He is friendly but stern, though part-time, he has a somewhat immature personality, such as singing music at home.
 Mariella Lorraine (voiced by Tabitha St. Germain) is Helen's Latina florist mother, who works as an actor in the community theater. Like her niece Carolina, she often uses Spanish words and phrases, giving the translation shortly afterwards. Her parents and maiden surname are unknown, but her brother Jorge (Carolina's father) is seen in the series.
 Lucille and Bernard Lorraine are Helen's grandparents. They live simple and odd lifestyles (such as selling a chair to a bear) and are allergic to certain things, such as flowers and bacon.
 Mrs. Clusky (voiced by Nicole Oliver) is Helen's teacher from Montreal. She was initially shocked when she found out that Martha could speak, though has since gotten used to it. She has three nieces, and a white poodle, François, who is very spoiled and demanding.

Guests
 Mr. Pangborn is a neighbor who recently moved to Martha's neighborhood. He has an elderly cat named Lightning and previously has a serious mice issue. Once Martha figured out how to deal with them, Mr. Pangborn allowed the mice to live at his house.

Production
The show's executive producer was Carol Greenwald, and it was developed for television by Emmy Award-winning writer Kenneth "Ken" Scarborough, the show's head writer who is also notable for other works such as Arthur and Doug. Other writers and screenwriters include Joe Fallon, Peter Hirsch, Kathy Waugh, Raye Lankford, Pippin Parker, Ron Holsey, Jessica Carleton, Matt Steinglass, and Dietrich Smith. The music for the series and the theme song are by Canadian composers Daniel Ingram and Hal Foxton Beckett. Lyrics for the theme song are by Ken Scarborough and performed by Robert Wilson.

The show was animated in Vancouver by DHX Media Vancouver (formerly Studio B Productions) using Adobe Flash. Meddaugh, the author of the book, was involved in the show and oversaw the production. Despite some concerns over the way word definitions would be incorporated into a television show, she was satisfied that they did not interrupt the flow of the story. Producer Carol Greenwald first contacted Meddaugh when she was involved in the PBS series Arthur.

Each episode features short animated segments related to the main parts in three occasions: one between the opening theme and the first part, another one between two parts, and the other between the second part and the closing credits. However, those short segments are not included in the version distributed outside the United States.

Broadcast and home media
The series premiered on PBS Kids on September 1, 2008 in the U.S. The series aired its final episode on November 18, 2014, with reruns continuing until October 2, 2022. Internationally, the series aired on TVOntario in Canada, Discovery Kids in Latin America, Disney Junior in the Netherlands, CBBC in the United Kingdom, and on Nick Jr. in Australia and New Zealand. On March 9, 2010, a DVD set of the series featuring 8 episodes from the first season was released. The series was also added to Amazon Prime Video.

Merchandise
PBS Kids reported that episodes of the series would be available as downloads in 2008. Episodes are also available for purchase via downloading.

In January 2010, Martha Speaks launched its first list of official tie-in books, which include 24-page readers, chapter books, and a picture book.

Notes

References

External links

 PBS Kids web page on Martha Speaks
 

2000s American animated television series
2010s American animated television series
2000s American children's comedy television series
2010s American children's comedy television series
2008 American television series debuts
2014 American television series endings
2000s Canadian animated television series
2010s Canadian animated television series
2008 Canadian television series debuts
2014 Canadian television series endings
American children's animated comedy television series
American children's animated education television series
American flash animated television series
American television shows based on children's books
American television series with live action and animation
Canadian children's animated comedy television series
Canadian children's animated education television series
Canadian flash animated television series
Canadian television shows based on children's books
Canadian television series with live action and animation
English-language education television programming
Animated television series about children
Animated television series about dogs
Elementary school television series
Television series by WGBH
Television series by DHX Media
PBS Kids shows
PBS original programming
TVO original programming